Luigi Franchi S.p.A. is an Italian manufacturer of firearms, a division of Beretta Holding.

Franchi products include the military SPAS-12 and SPAS-15 and the sporting-type long-recoil action AL-48. Franchi manufactures over and under, and semi-automatic shotguns.

Franchi remained a family business since its founding until 1987, when it was acquired by the industrial conglomerate Socimi, based in Milan; with the bankruptcy of Socimi in 1993, Franchi was acquired by Beretta Holding which is the current owner.

Firearms

Submachine guns
Franchi LF-57

Rifles
Franchi LF-58 - .30 Carbine assault rifle.
Franchi LF-59 - 7.62×51mm NATO battle rifle.
Franchi mod. 641 - 5.56×45mm NATO assault rifle
 Franchi 'Centennial' - .22LR rifle. Made in 1968 only to commemorate their 100-year anniversary.
 Franchi Para - .22LR Rifle - 8000 made, 3000 of which imported to the US by FIE

Shotguns

SPAS-12
SPAS-15
AL-48500
PA3
PA8
Franchi 912
Franchi 612
Franchi 620
Franchi 720
Franchi Intensity
Franchi Instinct L and SL
Franchi Renaissance Classic and Elite
Franchi Affinity
Franchi Alcione
Franchi LAW-12
Franchi SAS-12
Franchi 500
Franchi Momentum

Revolvers
 RF 83 - Inexpensive service revolver chambered in .38 Special

See also

 List of Italian companies
 List of Italian submachine guns

External links
 http://www.franchi.com/
 http://www.franchiusa.com/

Firearm manufacturers of Italy
Defence companies of Italy
Beretta
Italian brands
Companies based in le Marche
Manufacturing companies established in 1868
Italian companies established in 1868